Pipradhi Goth is a Devtal Rural Municipality  in Bara District in the Narayani Zone of south-eastern Nepal. At the time of the 1991 Nepal census it had a population of 3,530 persons living in 527 individual households. Pipradhi Goth is the second developed village in Bara District.

References

External links
UN map of the municipalities of Bara District

Populated places in Bara District